Whales in Cubicles were an English indie rock band from London, England, who played between 2010 and 2015. Whales in Cubicles took their inspiration for their band name from Andrew Bird's song "Plasticities".

Sound
The band's sound has been compared to that of Jeff Buckley, Pavement and Pixies.

History
Whales in Cubicles' early demos were self-recorded. Once posted online, the demos gained the band attention from the indie label Young and Lost Club, who released the recording of "We Never Win" as the band's first single in 2012. The single attracted the attention of XFM's John Kennedy, who featured the song as his X-posure Big One and invited the band to perform as his One Night Stand live session in February 2012.

Whales in Cubicles' second single, "Nowhere Flag", was recorded in Kent, England, and was produced by Simon "Barny" Barnicott, whose previous work included collaborations with artists such as Arctic Monkeys, Kasabian and Editors.
"Nowhere Flag" was released on Popular Recordings in August 2012, along with a DIY video featuring friend and Vogue model Emma Browning strapping London's famous landmarks with explosives before climbing Parliament Hill, London and demolishing the city.

In late 2012, Whales in Cubicles recorded their debut album, Death in the Evening at Monnow Valley Studio in Wales with producer Nick Mailing. The album, mixed by Simon "Barny" Barnicott, was released on vinyl and cd in February 2014.

The band continued to tour and work on their second full-length recording throughout 2015, playing out new songs in clubs around London and abroad.

Radio
Singles "We Never Win" and "Nowhere Flag" to their more recent "Disappear" received national radio rotation on BBC Radio 1 and BBC Radio 6 Music, as well as being playlisted on London's XFM.

Discography
"We Never Win" Single Young & Lost Club (23 January 2012)
"Nowhere Flag" Single Popular Recordings (6 August 2012)
"Disappear" Single (17 June 2013)
"Wax & Feathers" Single (7 October 2013)
"All the Pretty Flowers" Single (3 February 2014)
Death in the Evening LP club.the.mammoth (3 February 2014)

References

External links
 
 Official YouTube Channel

English indie rock groups